MidSouthCon is an annual multi-day fan convention in the Mid-Southern United States.

Background
Run by Mid-South Science and Fictions Conventions Inc., the annual multi-day fan convention focuses on anime, comic books, fantasy media, films, medieval weaponry, role-playing games, and science fiction.  The con's wide gamut of celebrated subjects has been recognized as one of its draws.

Past events

2000s
MidSouthCon 27 was held from March 21–22, 2009 at the Whispering Woods Conference Center in Olive Branch, Mississippi; both days cost , and featured guests included Vincent Di Fate, Stanton T. Friedman, Mike Resnick, and Ann VanderMeer.

2010s
In 2010, MidSouthCon 28 hosted about 1300 attendees from March 12–14 at Whispering Woods. MidSouthCon 30 returned to the Hilton Memphis from March 22–25, 2012; Mark Goddard, Marta Kristen, Andy Looney, Ethan Siegel, and Michael A. Stackpole were among the featured guests, and the four-day event cost . In 2015, MidSouthCon 33 hosted 2146 attendees. MidSouthCon 34, held in 2016 from March 18–20 at the Hilton Memphis, featured Christie Golden, Bob McLeod, and Ethan Siegel as guests. At the Hilton Memphis from March 9–11, 2018's MidSouthCon 36 expected 2300 attendees alongside featured guests Mike Carlin, Ellen Datlow, and Mike Resnick; the three-day pass cost .

Charity
At 2017's MidSouthCon 35,  was raised for Literacy Mid-South and the Science Fiction and Fantasy Writers of America's emergency medical fund.

References

External links
 

annual events in the United States
conventions in Mississippi
conventions in Tennessee
culture of Memphis, Tennessee
multigenre conventions
science fiction conventions in the United States